Highfields is a former coal mining village, located south of the model village of Woodlands, in South Yorkshire. Historically part of the West Riding of Yorkshire, it is part of the City of Doncaster. The village is located in the Adwick ward of Doncaster MBC.

Although it does not currently have an air of prosperity, Highfields was built so that most houses either overlooked farmland or woodland, the ornamental Highfields Lake, or the greens in the centre of the village. Like its neighbour, Woodlands, Highfields lies between the historic Great North Road and the Roman road.

The Roman road is a branch of Ermine Street, branching off near Lincoln and rejoining near York. Although a separate branch, it is also known as Ermine Street. Locally, this stretch of the road is known as the Roman Ridge, although it is more colloquially known as the Roman Rigg.

David Pegg, one of the eight Manchester United footballers who died as a result of the Munich air disaster of February 1958, was born at Highfields in 1935 and lived locally until he began his career with Manchester United in the early 1950s.

Half a mile south-east are the surviving earthworks, much overgrown, of Hangthwaite Castle, a medieval motte-and-bailey castle.

References

External links

Villages in Doncaster
Adwick le Street